That Uncertain Feeling is a British comedy drama television series which originally aired on BBC 2 in 1986. It is based on the 1955 novel of the same title by Kingsley Amis about a married Welsh librarian's entanglement with a sophisticated woman. The story had previously been made into the 1962 film Only Two Can Play. Gish went on to star in another Amis adaptation Stanley and the Women in 1991.

Main cast
 Denis Lawson as John Aneurin Lewis
 Sheila Gish as Elizabeth Gruffydd-Williams
 Brenda Blethyn as Jean Lewis
 Miles Anderson as Paul Whetstone
 Ann Beach as Mrs. Davies
 Philip Bowen as  Bill Evans
 David Calder as Vernon Gruffydd-Williams
 Richard Davies as Mr. Davis
 Davyd Harries as Mervyn the dentist
 Arbel Jones as Margot John
 Alison Matthews as  Eira Lewis 
 Neil McCaul as  Gareth Probert
 Gary Meredith as  Stan John
 Sharon Morgan as Dentist's mistress
 Gareth Potter as  Ken Davies
 Albert Welling as  Theo James
 Lowri Ann Richards as  Dilys
 Hugh Thomas as Ieuan Jenkins

References

Bibliography
 Lawrence Goldman. Oxford Dictionary of National Biography 2005–2008. OUP Oxford, 2013.

External links
 

BBC television dramas
1986 British television series debuts
1986 British television series endings
English-language television shows
Television shows based on British novels